Perry v Truefitt (1842) 6 Beav. 66 is a famous English case where the tort of passing off was first articulated. Leathart made a hair treatment product. He had shown the mixing process to Perry, a perfumer and hair-dresser, who decided to call the mixture "Medicated Mexican Balm". Perry marketed the mixture under the title "Perry's Medicated Mexican Balm".  Truefitt, one of Perry's competitors, made a product that was very similar to Perry's mixture, which he marketed under the name "Truefitt's Medicated Mexican Balm", using bottles and labels that looked like Perry's product. Perry filed a bill against Truefitt, arguing that the name "Medicated Mexican Balm" was valuable to his business and that he should have exclusive right to prevent others from using it. The Court denied Perry the right to the name. However, Lord Longdale held that misrepresentation can be grounds for an injunction, stating that "a man is not to sell his own goods under the pretence that they are the goods of another man".

See also
List of trademark case law

1842 in case law
1842 in British law
English tort case law
English law articles needing infoboxes